Smiley is a village in the Canadian province of Saskatchewan within the Rural Municipality of Prairiedale No. 321 and Census Division No. 13. The village is located approximately 20 km northwest of the town of Kindersley at the intersection of Highway 307 and Highway 772. The Grand Trunk Pacific Railway was completed in 1913, bringing an economic boom to the village's early years. On April 26, 1987 the Dodsland subdivision between Dodsland and Smiley was transferred to the Canadian Pacific Railway. Due to the close proximity to major grain centres such as Kindersley, CPR put the line up for abandonment and was granted permission to remove the track by the Canadian Transportation Agency on October 29, 1997.

An F3 tornado struck here leaving a 10-kilometre path and taking two unknown lives on July 6, 1935.

History 
Smiley incorporated as a village on November 26, 1913.

Demographics 

Attractions

The wall is made entirely of stones without the use of cement or mortar, for aesthetic purposes.

See also

 List of communities in Saskatchewan
 Hamlets of Saskatchewan

References

Villages in Saskatchewan
Prairiedale No. 321, Saskatchewan
Division No. 13, Saskatchewan